Thakkol (meaning : "key" in English) is a 2019 Malayalam thriller film directed by Kiron Prabhakaran and starring Indrajith Sukumaran and Murali Gopy. The film was in production for over a year. The lead cast had previously starred together in  Ee Adutha Kaalathu (2012), Left Right Left (2013) and Tiyaan (2017). The film is produced by director Shaji Kailas. Sukumaran and Gopy play priests in the film. The film was predominantly shot in Goa.

Cast 

Indrajith Sukumaran as Father Ambrose Vas Pochampalli
Murali Gopy as Father Mankunnath Paili 
Ineya as Sarah
Renji Panicker as Kuzhimattathil Clement / Clement Achayan / Clement Appachan
Sudev Nair as Father Silvester 
Meera Vasudevan as Jaceentha Morris Vas
Nedumudi Venu as Thomas IPS(retd), Thomachayan 
Gilu Joseph as Renji Panicker's wife
Thushara Pillai as Nedumudi Venu's wife
Nandhana Varma
Lal as Metropolitan Archbishop
Sudheer Karamana
Rushin as young Fr. Ambrose Vas Pochampalli
Telly Sebastian as Germiyas
Hani Mani as Guest appearance

Release and reception 
The film released on 6 December 2019. The Times of India gave the film a rating of three out of five stars and stated that "The title of the movie itself is an example for that as the story speaks about one’s key to wisdom and contentment in life". The New Indian Express gave the film the same rating and wrote that "Besides, the old-fashioned filmmaking approach, the slightly colour-drained images, and the mismatched background score make the film a bit of a chore to sit through".

References

External links 

 Indian thriller films
 Films shot in Goa
2010s Malayalam-language films
2019 thriller films